Bharat Chipli (Kannada: ಭರತ್ ಚಿಪ್ಲಿ) (born 27 January 1983 in Sagara, Karnataka) is an Indian cricketer who plays for Karnataka in first-class cricket.

Career
He studied at BHS College, Jayanagar, Bangalore. He plays for Swastic Union Cricket Club (I) in the KSCA Group, I Division. Chipli, an aggressive opening bat and also a dynamic fielder in the Karnataka Ranji squad. The right-hander was initially a part of the Royal Challengers Bangalore and was quite recently picked up by the Deccan Chargers in the Indian Premier League.

IPL 2011

Chipli was picked by the Deccan Chargers for their 2011 campaign. Chipli made his debut in IPL 4 against the formidable side Rajasthan Royals. His second match for IPL 2011 was against the Kolkata Knight Riders where he scored 48 runs off 40 balls which was the highest individual score for his team. But Deccan Chargers went on to lose that match by 9 runs.
His match winning innings came against his old franchisee Royal Challengers Bangalore when he scored a blistering 65 runs off 35 balls with five 4s and three 6s.

IPL 2012

In IPL 2012 Season Chipli failed to live up to the expectation of his franchise and fans with mediocre scores of 10 (against CSK), 1 (against MI), DNB (against RR), 25* (against DD) while batting.

References

External links
Bharath Chipli's Official Twitter Page
Cricinfo - Players and Officials - Bharat Chipli
Royal Challengers Bangalore Squad - Indian Premier League, 2007/08

1983 births
Living people
Royal Challengers Bangalore cricketers
Karnataka cricketers
Indian cricketers
People from Shimoga district
Delhi Capitals cricketers
Deccan Chargers cricketers
South Zone cricketers
Cricketers from Karnataka